John Garbh Maclean may refer to:
John Garbh Maclean, 1st Laird of Coll (15th century)
John Garbh Maclean, 7th Laird of Coll (17th century)

See also
John Maclean (disambiguation)